Texas Flip N Move is an American reality television series airing on DIY Network, located between Fort Worth and Decatur.

Series overview

Episodes

Season 1

Season 2

Season 3

Season 4

Season 5

Season 6

Season 7

Season 8

Season 9

Season 10

Season 11

Season 12

References

Texas Flip and Move